Bruno Pais (born 10 June 1981) is a Portuguese triathlete who represents S.L. Benfica.

Pais finished 17th in the men's triathlon at the 2008 Summer Olympics. He placed 41st at the 2012 Summer Olympics men's triathlon, on 7 August.

References

1981 births
Living people
Portuguese male triathletes
Triathletes at the 2008 Summer Olympics
Triathletes at the 2012 Summer Olympics
Olympic triathletes of Portugal
S.L. Benfica (triathlon)
20th-century Portuguese people
21st-century Portuguese people